Uvis Helmanis (born June 10, 1972) is a former Latvian professional basketball player who played at power forward position. After retiring he became a basketball coach, and currently works as a head coach for Löwen Erfurt.

Player profile
Helmanis has been a key player for the National Team since the nineties and is known for being experienced and powerful. Some coaches were trying to put this 2.04 m player under the basket but his style tends to draw him away from the hoop. Helmanis can use his big body in the paint, especially on defense, but his most effective weapon is his ability to knock down the three-point shot. He doesn't look very quick, but he is adept at getting himself open from behind the three-point line. Helmanis has been a National Champion in three different countries in his career: Latvia, Poland and Germany. After four good years at Bamberg, Helmanis came back to Latvia and celebrated his homecoming with "eternal" national champs BK Ventspils and showed all his best assets in the Baltic league and in ULEB Cup games. He is not a vocal leader, but an irreplaceable member of the team. In the summer of 2009 Helmanis became the first Latvian to play in six EuroBaskets.

After winning the Latvian Championship with Barons LMT in 2010 he retired as a player and became a head coach of the team. After unsuccessful results he was fired in midseason and went to Poland to work for the assistant of Dainius Adomaitis, head coach of Czarni Słupsk. After one season Uvis came back to Latvia and joined a coach room of BC VEF Rīga, becoming an assistant of head coach Ramunas Butautas. He became head coach of BK Liepājas Lauvas in 2013.

References

1972 births
Living people
ASK Riga players
BK Ventspils players
Brose Bamberg players
Forwards (basketball)
Latvian basketball coaches
Latvian expatriate basketball people in Germany
Latvian expatriate basketball people in Lithuania
Latvian expatriate basketball people in Poland
Latvian men's basketball players
People from Talsi